Kontovouni is a village and a community of the Kozani municipality. Before the 2011 local government reform it was part of the municipality of Elimeia, of which it was a municipal district. The 2011 census recorded 45 inhabitants in the village and 116 inhabitants in the community of Kontovouni. The community of Kontovouni covers an area of 5.226 km2.

Administrative division
The community of Kontovouni consists of two separate settlements: 
Kontovouni (population 45)
Pyrgos (population 71)
The aforementioned populations figures are as of 2011.

See also
List of settlements in the Kozani regional unit

References

Populated places in Kozani (regional unit)